At the 1936 Winter Olympics at Garmisch-Partenkirchen, Germany, alpine skiing was arranged for the first time in the Olympics, a combined event for men and women.

Both downhills were run on Kreuzjoch on Friday, 7 February, with the women at 11:00 and the men at noon.  The two-run slalom races were run on the weekend at Gudiberg with the women's event on Saturday and the men's on Sunday.

Medal summary

Source:

Medal table

Course information

Source:

Participating nations
Eight nations had both female and male alpine skiers participating. Austria, Estonia, the Netherlands, Spain, and Switzerland only competed with female alpine skiers.

A total of 103 alpine skiers (66 men and 37 women) from 26 nations (men from 21 nations and women from 13 nations) competed at the Garmisch-Partenkirchen Games:

References

External links
 International Olympic Committee results database
 Ski Map.org - Garmisch-Partenkirchen - 6 maps
 Alpine Ski Maps.com - Garmisch-Partenkirchen

 
1936 Winter Olympics events
Alpine skiing at the Winter Olympics
1936 in alpine skiing
Alpine skiing competitions in Germany